Swordfish is a 2001 American action thriller film directed by Dominic Sena, written by Skip Woods, produced by Joel Silver, and starring John Travolta, Hugh Jackman, Halle Berry, Don Cheadle, Vinnie Jones, and Sam Shepard. The film centers on Stanley Jobson, an ex-con and computer hacker who is targeted for recruitment into a bank robbery conspiracy because of his formidable hacking skills.

Plot 
Stanley Jobson is a cyber-hacker who became notorious for infecting the FBI's Carnivore program with a computer virus. Stanley's parole forbids him from accessing the internet and computers while his ex-wife Melissa, an alcoholic and part-time porn star, has issued a restraining order against him. This also prevents him from seeing his only daughter Holly.

Ginger Knowles persuades Stanley to work for Gabriel Shear, who threatens him into cracking a secure Defense Department server. After the hack, Gabriel offers Stanley $10 million to program a multi-headed worm, a "hydra", to siphon $9.5 billion from government slush funds. Stanley begins work on the worm, learning that Gabriel leads Black Cell, a secret organization created by J. Edgar Hoover to launch retaliatory attacks against terrorists that threaten the United States. He also privately discovers Ginger is a DEA agent working undercover and is further surprised to discover a corpse that resembles Gabriel.

After he takes Holly home from school, Stanley discovers that he is being followed by FBI agent J.T. Roberts, who had previously arrested him. Roberts, though monitoring Stanley closely, is more interested in Gabriel as he does not appear on any government database, and after learning that another hacker, Axl Torvalds had been killed by Gabriel's men, warns Stanley to be cautious. Stanley opts to secretly code a backdoor in his hydra that reverses the money transfer after a short period. Meanwhile, U.S. Senator Jim Reisman, who oversees Black Cell, learns the FBI has started tracking Gabriel and orders him to stand down. Gabriel refuses and narrowly defeats a hit team dispatched against him by Reisman. In retaliation, Gabriel personally kills Reisman in revenge and continues his plan.

Stanley delivers the hydra to Gabriel and leaves to see Holly, only to find that Gabriel has kidnapped her and framed him for Melissa's murder alongside her husband and porn producer. Stanley has no choice but to participate in a bank heist to get Holly back. At the site of the heist, Gabriel and his men storm a branch and secure its employees and customers as hostages, fitting each of them with ball-bearing-based explosives similar to Claymore mines. When police and FBI surround the branch, Gabriel takes Stanley to a nearby coffee shop across the street to meet with Roberts, but Gabriel spends the time discussing the film Dog Day Afternoon and the nature of misdirection. Once back in the bank, Gabriel has one of his men escort a hostage to demonstrate the situation where a sharpshooter kills the man. As other agents pull the hostage away from the bank, the bomb detonates and devastates much of the street, a scene shown in medias res.

Gabriel instructs Stanley to launch the hydra and turns Holly over to him once completed. However, the back door triggers before they can leave the bank, leading to Stanley being recaptured while Holly is rescued. Gabriel threatens to kill Ginger, who he knows is a DEA agent, unless Stanley re-siphons the money back to a Monte Carlo bank. Although Stanley complies, Gabriel shoots Ginger. Gabriel and his men load the hostages onto a bus and demand a plane wait for them at the local airport, but while en route, the bus is lifted off by an S-64 Aircrane and deposited on the roof of a local skyscraper. Gabriel deactivates the bombs and departs with his surviving men on a waiting helicopter, which Stanley shoots down using a rocket-propelled grenade from the bus.

Roberts takes Stanley to verify a corpse they found, believing Gabriel was a Mossad agent. There is no record of a DEA agent named Ginger Knowles, and her body hasn't been found. Stanley recognizes the corpse as the one he discovered earlier and personally realizes that the whole scenario was a deception; Ginger was wearing a bulletproof vest and was working with Gabriel all along, who escaped via a different route. Despite Stanley not telling the police that Gabriel and Ginger are still alive, Roberts arranges for Stanley to have full custody of Holly, where they depart to places elsewhere. In Monte Carlo, Gabriel and Ginger withdraw the stolen money and later watch as a yacht at sea explodes. Over the film's credits, a news report reveals the destruction of the yacht, carrying a known terrorist, as the third such incident in as many weeks.

Cast

Reception 
The film received press initially because word leaked out early that Halle Berry was doing her first topless scene, paid an extra $500,000 on top of her $2 million fee. Critics said the scene looked forced, just to garner press. "Halle Berry Nude" jumped to the top of search engine results. Berry said she did the topless scene, knowing it was gratuitous, to overcome the fear of appearing nude onscreen.

, 25% of the 138 reviews compiled on Rotten Tomatoes are positive, with an average rating of 4.35/10. The website's critical consensus reads: "Swordfish is big on explosions, but critics dislike how it skimps on plot and logic. Also, the sight of a person typing at a computer just isn't that interesting." In a review for The New York Times, Stephen Holden wrote:

The film grossed over $147 million in worldwide box office receipts on a production budget of $102 million. John Travolta's performance in the film earned him a Razzie Award nomination for Worst Actor (also for Domestic Disturbance).

Soundtrack 

The soundtrack was produced by Paul Oakenfold, under Village Roadshow and Warner Bros. and distributed through London Sire Records, Inc. It contains 15 tracks. The film's orchestral score was written by Christopher Young with several electronic additions by Paul Oakenfold. Fragments from the score were added to the official soundtrack, but were remixed by Oakenfold. A more complete release was issued as an award promo, which is known for its rarity.

References 

2001 films
2001 crime thriller films
2000s heist films
2000s spy thriller films
American crime thriller films
American heist films
American spy thriller films
Films about computer hacking
Films directed by Dominic Sena
Films produced by Joel Silver
Films scored by Christopher Young
Films set in Los Angeles
Films shot in Los Angeles
Films shot in Monaco
Films shot in Oregon
Films with screenplays by Skip Woods
Malware in fiction
Silver Pictures films
Techno-thriller films
Village Roadshow Pictures films
Warner Bros. films
2000s English-language films
2000s American films